Christian Landu Landu (born 25 January 1992) is a Norwegian footballer currently playing for Bryne FK.

Landu Landu is of Congolese descent, but has represented Norway at youth international level.

Club career
Landu Landu was born in Stavanger and started his career in local club Tasta, before he joined Viking in 2005. He trained with the Viking first-team for the first time in 2006, and later, while still a youth player, began training with the first team every day. Egil Østenstad described him as a talented player.

He made his debut for the Viking first team as substitute in a Norwegian Premier League match on 3 August 2008, and started his first full-game against Sandefjord in Sandefjord. In the 2009 season he made 4 appearances for the first team, with another 12 following in the 2010 season. 
In November 2009 the player's agent claimed he was on trial at Liverpool.

International career
He has been capped at all levels from U15 to U21 by Norway.

Personal life
He was born in Stavanger to parents of Congolese ancestry. His father played football in his home country, but never at top level. He was at a young age brought to football by friends. He started his career as a goalkeeper, but thought that was boring after a while. He said that he suited best to an outfield role in an interview in 2009.

Career statistics

References

External links
Profile on Viking FK website

1992 births
Living people
Sportspeople from Stavanger
Norwegian people of Democratic Republic of the Congo descent
Norwegian footballers
Viking FK players
Tromsø IL players
Sandnes Ulf players
Eliteserien players
Association football midfielders
Association football defenders